Fu Yuncheng (born 22 December 1998) is a Chinese footballer currently playing as a defender for Guangzhou R&F.

Club career
Fu Yuncheng would play for the Dalian youth team before being sent on loan to third tier football club Dalian Chanjoy on 10 March 2018. He would make his senior debut in the 2018 Chinese FA Cup third round game against Zhejiang Yiteng on 10 April 2018 that ended in a 1-1 draw but was won 3-0 on penalty's. He would return to Dalian the following season but was unable to break into the first team and was allowed to join Guangzhou R&F on 10 February 2020.

Fu would make his debut for Guangzhou R&F on 18 September 2020 in a Chinese FA Cup game against Shanghai Shenhua that ended in a 1-1 draw, but was lost on penalties. This would be followed by his league debut on 27 September 2020 against Shandong Luneng Taishan in a 0-0 draw. To gain more playing time he was loaned out to third tier club Sichuan Minzu for the 2021 China League Two season on 5 July 2021.

Career statistics

References

External links 

1998 births
Living people
Chinese footballers
Association football defenders
China League Two players
Dalian Professional F.C. players
Guangzhou City F.C. players